Enneapterygius philippinus, the minute triplefin, is a species of triplefin blenny in the genus Enneapterygius. It was described by Wilhelm Peters in 1868. This species occurs in the Indo-Pacific from Christmas Island to Samoa, and from the Ryukyu Islands in the north south to Australia.

References

philippinus
Fish described in 1868
Taxa named by Wilhelm Peters